The Sviyaga (Zöya; , Sĕve) is a river in the Ulyanovsk Oblast and Tatarstan, a right tributary of the Volga. The Sviyaga flows into the Sviyaga Cove of the Kuybyshev Reservoir, west of Kazan. It freezes up in November or December and stays under the ice until April or May. Major tributaries are the Arya, Birlya, Bula, Karla, Kubnya, Sulitsa and Tosha rivers.

The city of Ulyanovsk is along the Sviyaga.

The castle of Sviyazhsk, which dates to 1551, is on the island in Sviyaga Cove of the Kuybyshev Reservoir.

References 

Rivers of Ulyanovsk Oblast
Rivers of Tatarstan